The High Sheriff of Longford was the British Crown's judicial representative in County Longford, Ireland from the 16th century until 1922, when the office was abolished in the new Free State and replaced by the office of Longford County Sheriff. The sheriff had judicial, electoral, ceremonial and administrative functions and executed High Court Writs. In 1908, an Order in Council made the Lord-Lieutenant the Sovereign's prime representative in a county and reduced the High Sheriff's precedence. However the sheriff retained his responsibilities for the preservation of law and order in the county. The usual procedure for appointing the sheriff from 1660 onwards was that three persons were nominated at the beginning of each year from the county and the Lord Lieutenant then appointed his choice as High Sheriff for the remainder of the year. Often the other nominees were appointed as under-sheriffs. Sometimes a sheriff did not fulfil his entire term through death or other event and another sheriff was then appointed for the remainder of the year. The dates given hereunder are the dates of appointment.  All addresses are in County Longford unless stated otherwise.

Longford was created in 1569.

High Sheriffs of County Longford
1590: Fergus O'Farrell
1611: Robert Bellingham
1623: Sir Richard Browne, 1st Baronet
1646: John Edgeworth of Cranallagh Castle
1655: James Shaen
1680: Charles Fox of Fox Hall
1681: Charles Adare
1686: James Nugent
1692: Charles Fox of Fox Hall
1696: Mathew Wilder of Castle Wilder
1698: Anthony Sheppard
 Redmund Mulledy

18th century

1799: Alexander Kingston

19th century

20th century
1903: John Arthur Maconchy.
1904:
1905: Willoughby James Bond.
1906: Charles James Clerk of Castlecor.
1908: Henry Bevan Wilson-Slator of Edgeworthstown.
1909: Augustine Hugh Lefroy of Carrigglas Manor.
1910: Lambert John Dopping-Hepenstall of Altadore Castle.

References

 
Longford
History of County Longford